The Vivero Letter is a first-person narrative novel written by English author Desmond Bagley, and was first published in 1968. It was also made into a film in 1998 of the same name starring Robert Patrick, Fred Ward and Chiara Caselli.

Plot introduction
Jeremy Wheale's brother is murdered by criminals attempting to steal a family heirloom: a 16th-century gold tray. In attempting to find out what was so special about the tray that someone would kill for it, he discovers that it contains a map. Wheale pursues the trail from Devon, England to Mexico and finally to the tropical rain forests of the Yucatán Peninsula, where he joins with two archaeologists to locate a legendary hoard of gold. This hoard comes from Uaxuanoc, the centuries-old lost city of the Mayas. However, the Mafia are on the trail of Wheale as well as the Chicleros, a deadly group of convict mercenaries, and Wheale is uncertain that he can even trust his two archaeologist friends.

External links
Crime Time review of Desmond Bagley
Fantastic Fiction site with publication history

1968 British novels
Novels by Desmond Bagley
Novels set in Mexico
British novels adapted into films
William Collins, Sons books